The northern velvet gecko (Pseudothecadactylus australis) is a gecko endemic to Australia.

References

Pseudothecadactylus
Reptiles described in 1877
Taxa named by Albert Günther
Geckos of Australia